White Wolf is a game magazine that was published by White Wolf Publishing from 1986 to 1995.

History
While still in high school, Stewart Wieck and Steve Wieck decided to self-publish their own magazine, and Steve chose the name "White Wolf" after Elric of Melniboné. White Wolf #1 was published by their White Wolf Publishing in August 1986 and distributors began to order the magazine a few issues later as its print runs continued to increase.  In 1990, Lion Rampant and White Wolf Publishing decided to merge into a new company that was simply called "White Wolf", and in an editorial in the magazine Stewart Weick explained that the magazine would remain independent despite the company's interest in role-playing production.  With issue #50 (1995), the magazine's name was changed to White Wolf: Inphobia, but the magazine was cancelled by issue #57.

Reception
White Wolf won the Origins Award for "Best Professional Adventure Gaming Magazine" in 1991, and again in 1992.

Reviews
Dragon #212

References

Defunct magazines published in the United States
Magazines established in 1986
Magazines disestablished in 1995
Magazines published in Virginia
Origins Award winners
Role-playing game magazines